Zločiny Velké Prahy (The Crimes of Greater Prague) is  a Czech crime television series. The series takes place in 1922, in the period when central Prague merged with thirty-eight cities to create Great Prague. However, according to the creators, the individual stories are meant to sound simultaneously. The series has ten parts and is directed by Jaroslav Brabec. Writer and historian Michal Dlouhý who also orked on the script of Četnické humoresky, collaborated on the series.

The main roles were played by Jaroslav Plesl, Jiří Langmajer and Denis Šafařík. The first episode of the series was broadcast by station ČT1 on 31 January 2021. The last episode aired on Sunday, 4 April 2021.

Cast
Jaroslav Plesl as chief inspector Hynek Budík
Jiří Langmajer as district inspector Rudolf Havlík
Denis Šafařík as police agent Martin Nováček
Lenka Vlasáková as Ilona Budíková, Budík's wife
Darija Pavlovičová as Julie Budíková, Budík's daughter
Sabina Rojková as Sisi, Budík's stepdaughter
Lucie Žáčková as Toni, close friend of Inspector Havlík
Ildikó Vargová as Enikő, servant of the Budík family
Mira Štěpánová as Pavlínka, inspector Havlík's protégé
Jiří Bartoška as police president Antonín Král
Miroslav Táborský as chief commissioner
Ondřej Malý as chief inspector Braun
František Němec as doctor Málek
Jiří Lábus as pathologist
Josef Carda as judge
Predrag Bjelac as baron Milotín
Martin Myšička as JUDr. Herman Herzog
Jiří Roskot as Pavel Drábek
Miroslav Horský as řidič Neužil
Anita Krausová as prostitute
Martina Babišová as prostitute
Václav Jiráček as Milan

References

External links 

Czech crime television series
2021 Czech television series debuts
Czech Television original programming